The Southeast Asian Floorball Championships was an international floorball competition of the Southeast Asian nations. It was held only once in 2014 and took place in Singapore.

Summaries

Men's

Women's

References 

ASEAN sports events
Floorball competitions